Chwalibogowo Palace is a palace in Chwalibogowo (Września County, Poland).

Description
The palace is an example of French Renaissance architecture that found in Wielkopolska. Storey building with a slightly protruding risalit in the center, was covered with a mansard roof. The palace in the nineteenth century it was owned by the family Kęszyckich. The last owner was a Lieutenant Colonel A. Myszkowski.

History
By 1920 the village was in the hands of the Czech Germanised von Skrbenskich family. Rudolph von Skrbensky built a palace and a water tower still standing in the local park. After the political changes in 1945 manor allocated to Manufacturing cooperative set up by the local peasants and workers.

External links 
  Chwalibogowo-Palace
  History of Chwalibogowo

Gmina Września
Palaces in Poland